Austro-Daimler was an Austro-Hungarian automaker company, from 1899 until 1934. It was a subsidiary of the German Daimler-Motoren-Gesellschaft (DMG) until 1909.

Early history
In 1890, Eduard Bierenz was appointed as Austrian retailer. The company sold so well that it also began manufacturing the automobiles after uniting with Eduard Fischer's engineering factory. The works were located at Wiener-Neustadt. By this subsidiary DMG became the first automotive multinational in history.

Thus on August 11, 1899, the Austrian Daimler Engine Society was founded. Whilst the assembling parts stemmed from Stuttgart, in 1900 they built their first automobile which featured 2 cylinders, and 4 seats. Soon they started producing engines for luxurious cars, trucks, buses, maritime ships, and trains.

Paul Daimler era
 
In 1902, Paul Daimler, Gottlieb Daimler's son, took charge of the Technical Department. He developed a compact car (8 hp, 45 km/h). In 1905 he built the company's first armoured car, which had . Also, the company produced engines for both trucks and buses. However, Daimler returned to Stuttgart in 1905 to take over the research and development department, which had been vacated by Maybach.

Ferdinand Porsche era
Senior Ferdinand Porsche took Daimler's place as technical designer. Although Austro-Daimler cars were competing at races already, Porsche pioneered aerodynamic usage with two famous racecars (Mixte and Maya). Also, he designed the Mercédès-Electrique-Mixte which was manufactured from 1902 until 1907.

Porsche also impelled a company reformation, at a time when the company had 800 workers. The company was renamed 'Austro-Daimler' on July 27, 1906. That same year Emil Jellinek — who was Austrian too — bought several Austro-Daimler licenses to found ancillary companies abroad.

In 1908, the Austro-Daimler began producing Zeppelin engines. Indeed, for Porsche this was a personal interest since he liked to take Archduke Franz Ferdinand flying over Vienna.

Pushing the company's development further, Porsche granted Austro-Daimler's definitive independence from DMG's ownership in 1909. In 1910, the company was renamed Oesterreichische Daimler Motoren AG (Austrian Daimler Engines AG) whose logo was the Austrian Royal double-headed eagle. In 1912 DMG sold its remaining shares.

In 1911 Austro-Daimler began producing the Prinz Heinrich (in English: Prince Henry) model; this car, which featured an overhead cam 5,714-cc four-cylinder engine, quickly became famous. It could develop 95 bhp at 2,100 rpm; there was also a less potent version with side valves and a 6,900-cc engine capable of developing  at only 1,200 rpm. Both designs were by Porsche.

WW I

During the First World War, the 4,500 workers of Austro-Daimler contributed in large quantities to wartime production. They played a key role in the 1918 Austro-Hungarian January Strike in which workers inspired by the Bolshevik seizure of power took strike action to oppose the war. A key factor in the strike was the halving of the flour ration. Porsche met the workers and agreed to drive to Vienna to speak to the Minister of Food. However, his plea to the workers to return to work was ignored and they marched on the Town Hall. Here they were joined by other workers from the locomotive factory, the radiator works, the aircraft factory and local ammunition plants of G. Rath and the Lichtenwörther. The assembly soon numbered over 10,000 and the Stadtholder phoned the Volksernährungsamt - the state organisation managing food supply. However, the minister, General Anton Höfer only promised to meet a delegation of the workers. The strike spread across the empire and involved over 700,000 workers.

1920–1930s

After the war, the company returned to the production of automobiles. Austro-Daimler still claimed Royal patronage via its connection with Prince Heinrich.

Soon, the company began collapsing. In the first place, Austro-Daimler fused with several companies — Skoda, Fiat, and Puch (1928). Then, it was submerged under Camillo Castiglioni's squandering management.

At this time, Porsche created the 1.3-liter "Sascha" racing cars (named after their backer, Count Sascha Kolowrat-Krakowski) in the early 1920s. The smallest model the company offered was a 2,212-cc four-cylinder. However, as the economic situation worsened, Porsche abandoned the company in 1923, ridding himself of Austro-Daimler's financial difficulties. Instead, he moved to Stuttgart's DMG.

The outstanding production car offered by Austro-Daimler during the 1930s was the ADM, which featured overhead cam six-cylinder engines of 2,540 cc, 2,650 cc, and 2,994 cc. The last-named (the ADM III) developed  at 4,000 rpm and was one of the greatest automobiles of the decade.  Also offered was a less luxurious sporting version, the  ADR.

1931 saw Austro-Daimler introduce a 4,624-cc eight-cylinder car, a superb, highly expensive luxury vehicle. In 1934 the company merged with Steyr Automobile, creating the Steyr-Daimler-Puch conglomerate. However, in this same year, Austro-Daimler was dissolved.

Postwar era
In the 1970s and into the 1980s bicycles were made by Steyr-Daimler-Puch with some models bearing the Puch trademark, and more upscale models bearing the Austro-Daimler trademark. When the bicycle manufacturing aspects of the consortium were sold in 1987 to Piaggio & C. S.p.A. of Italy, the Puch trademark was conveyed however, the rights to the name Austro-Daimler were not sold. Since then no bicycles have been made bearing this trademark.

Prominent members of staff

Designers
Willibald Gatter
Oskar Hacker
Karl Rabe

Workers
 Josip Broz Tito during 1912–13

See also
Daimler-Motoren-Gesellschaft
USA Daimler
Steyr-Daimler-Puch

Gallery

References

External links
 Austro-Daimler Vent Noir II — article about Austro-Daimler bicycles & history of the Puch Austro Daimler company, pamphlets + images.
 Projekt AUSTRO DAIMLER — Homepage of an Austrian project team that aims to revive the car brand Austro Daimler.
 A-D Bikes — 'Homepage of A-D Bikes that is a revival of the bicycle brand Austro-Daimler.

 
Daimler Motoren Gesellschaft
Defunct manufacturing companies of Austria-Hungary
Motor vehicle manufacturers of Austria
Motor vehicle manufacturers of Austria-Hungary
Aircraft engine manufacturers of Austria
Defunct aircraft engine manufacturers
Defunct companies of Austria
Vehicle manufacturing companies established in 1899
Vehicle manufacturing companies disestablished in 1934
1934 disestablishments in Austria
Vintage vehicles
Wiener Neustadt
Companies of Austria-Hungary
Economy of Lower Austria
Austrian companies established in 1899
Defunct motor vehicle manufacturers of Austria